Legislaive elections were held in the Russian Empire in September 1912 to elect the fourth State Duma.

Results
Around 51% of those elected were nobles, the highest during the Tsarist era. Both the right- and left-wing increased their representation in the Duma; right-wing candidates won 153 seats and left-wingers 152, whilst the centrists, including the Union of October 17, were reduced to 130 seats.

Aftermath
Following the elections, the Union of October 17 became an opposition party due to its harassment by the government during the election.

References

Russia
Russia
Legislative
Legislative elections in Russia
Russia